Jesse Öst (born 20 October 1990) is a Finnish professional footballer who plays as a goalkeeper for Veikkausliiga club HJK.

International career
Öst has represented Finland at under-21 level and was once on the bench for the senior team in a 4-2 loss to Mexico in October 2013.

References

1990 births
Living people
Finnish footballers
FF Jaro players
Jakobstads BK players
Degerfors IF players
Seinäjoen Jalkapallokerho players
Veikkausliiga players
Ykkönen players
Kakkonen players
Superettan players
Association football goalkeepers
Finnish expatriate footballers
Finnish expatriate sportspeople in Sweden
Expatriate footballers in Sweden
Helsingin Jalkapalloklubi players